The Yamaha X-City 125/250 is a large-wheeled, fuel-injected Maxiscooter introduced in 2007, with either a 125 cc or 250 cc engine — both water-cooled, four-stroke, catalytic-converter-equipped and Euro 3 compliant.  The models are internally designated VP125 and VP250, respectively, and each features a fully automatic transmission.

Manufactured and assembled by Yamaha in Italy, the X-City uses engines by Minarelli. The X-City features a 16-inch front and 15 inch rear wheel.  The X-City's underseat trunk can accommodate one helmet and has a front lockable glovebox. Instrumentation features speedometer, odometer, fuel gauge, coolant temperature, and ambient temperature gauge with frost warning. The fuel tank can hold  10.5 liters.

Marketed in Europe, primarily Italy, France, Spain, UK and Germany — but not in Asia or North America — the X-City supersedes the Yamaha Varsity 300 and was itself followed by the Yamaha X-MAX.  The 2009 X-City received a four-position, height adjustable windshield and a rear carrier base.

External links 
 Official Yamaha Europe X-City 250 Page

References

X-City
Motor scooters
Motorcycles introduced in 2007